The East Bay Athletic League (EBAL) is a high school sports league in the North Coast Section of the California Interscholastic Federation. The league was created in 1964; previously teams competed in the "East Bay Division" (EBD) of the Diablo Valley Athletic League (DVAL). Its member institutions are located in the eastern region of the San Francisco Bay Area, in the cities of Concord, Danville, San Ramon, Dublin, Pleasanton, and Livermore.
In the fall of 2016 the E.B.A.L. expanded to a 10 team league (De La Salle competing in boys sports & Carondelet in girls sports) by adding Dublin High School, and Dougherty Valley High School. De La Salle stopped competing in EBAL Football in 2012-13 and competed as an Independent school in football. In 2018, De La Salle was re-admitted back into the EBAL Football League and now competes again for the league title.
Also in 2018, the EBAL split its Football League into two "Divisions"; the Mountain Division (consisting of California, De La Salle, Foothill, San Ramon and Monte Vista)  and the "Valley Division" (consisting of Amador Valley, Dougherty Valley, Dublin, Granada and Livermore). In 2020, Foothill moved to the Valley Division and in 2021, Amador Valley moved to the Mountain Division.
In the fall of 2019 the E.B.A.L. expanded to a 11 team league by adding Clayton Valley High School to the league, competing in the Mountain Division in football.

The league has twelve affiliated schools.
 Amador Valley High School, Pleasanton (1964-Current)
 California High School, San Ramon (1976-Current)
 Carondelet High School - (All Girls) Concord (2008-Current)
 Clayton Valley High School, Concord (2019-Current)
 De La Salle High School - (All Boys) Concord (2008-Current)
 Dougherty Valley High School, San Ramon (2007-2008, 2016-Current)
 Dublin High School, Dublin (1969-1988, 2016-Current)
 Foothill High School, Pleasanton (1976-Current)
 Granada High School, Livermore (1965-Current)
 Livermore High School, Livermore (1964-Current)
 Monte Vista High School, Danville (1972-1992, 1996-Current)
 San Ramon Valley High School, Danville (1972-Current)

Former members
 Salesian High School (1964-1966)
 Berkeley High School (1996-2000) (to be verified)
 Liberty High School (Brentwood) (1964-1974)
 St. Vincent High School (Vallejo) (1964-1968)
 Albany High School (1964-1972)
 John Swett High School (1964-1972)
 San Leandro High School (1989-1991)

It also fields nineteen sports.
 Badminton
 Baseball 
 Basketball
 Cross Country 
 Football
 Boys' Golf
 Girls' Golf
 Lacrosse
 Soccer
 Softball
 Stunt
 Swimming and Diving
 Boys' Tennis
 Girls' Tennis
 Track and Field
 Boys' Volleyball
 Girls' Volleyball
 Water Polo
 Wrestling

Professional (Major League) alumni

Boy's Athletic Champions

Sports in the San Francisco Bay Area
CIF North Coast Section